Pointner is a surname. Notable people with the surname include:

Alexander Pointner (born 1971), Austrian ski jumping coach
Anton Pointner (1894–1949), Austrian film actor
Erich Pointner (born 1950), Austrian judoka
Hans Pointner (1908–date of death unknown), Austrian wrestler